John F. Shoupe (September 30, 1851 in Cincinnati – February 13, 1920 in Cincinnati) was a 19th-century professional baseball player.  Shoupe appeared in 11 games for the Troy Trojans in 1879, 2 games for the St. Louis Brown Stockings in 1882, and 1 game for the Washington Nationals (UA) in 1884. Sometimes he is credited as John Shoup.

External links

1851 births
1920 deaths
Baseball players from Cincinnati
Troy Trojans players
St. Louis Brown Stockings (AA) players
Washington Nationals (UA) players
19th-century baseball players
Memphis Reds (League Alliance) players
Janesville Mutual players
Binghamton Crickets (1870s) players
Springfield, Ohio (minor league baseball) players
Oswego Sweegs players
Oswego Starchboxes players
Scranton Miners players
Sandusky Fish Eaters players
Manchester Maroons players
Hamilton (minor league baseball) players
McKeesport (minor league baseball) players